Ducklo is a locality in the Western Downs Region, Queensland, Australia.

Geography 
The Glenmorgan railway line passes from the north-east (Nandi) to the west (Kumbarilla) of the locality. The locality is served by Ducklo railway station.

The Moonie Highway also passes from the north-east (Nandi) to the south-west of the locality (Kumbarilla) but to the south of the railway line.

History 
The name Ducklo may refer to low-flying ducks along the Clay Hole Gully.

The Ducklo railway siding was a mail receiving office from 1913. It subsequently became a post office. It closed in 1970.

Ducklo State School opened on 25 January 1915. It closed in 1963.

The Anglican Church of the Holy Apostles was dedicated on 12 October 1915 by Archbishop St Clair Donaldson. Its last service was held in October 1941. The church building was relocated to Bowenville where it was dedicated as St  Luke's Anglican Church on 30 March 1952 by Venerable Frank Knight.  It closed on 31 March 1982.

References 

Western Downs Region
Localities in Queensland